Tantaliana crepax is a moth in the family Eupterotidae. It was described by Wallengren in 1860. It is found in South Africa.

References

Moths described in 1860
Janinae